Makhmur is a town and district in Erbil Governorate that is under Iraqi federal control, only smaller eastern part of the city is still under Peshmerga control.

Background 
During the 2014 ISIL crisis, the town was taken over by ISIL militants before being regained again by combined Kurdish forces. A volunteer civilian militia to defend the town in the future was started in response. The town was then captured by the Iraqi Army from the Peshmerga in October 2017.

During the 2017 Iraqi–Kurdish conflict, clashes were reported on the outskirts of the town between Peshmerga forces and the Iraqi army, supported by the Popular Mobilization Forces (also known as Hashd al-Shaabi), until it was fully recaptured by the Iraqi Government.

Refugee camp 

Situated in the Makhmur District is the Makhmur refugee camp, which was founded in 1998. Around 12,000 Kurdish refugees, who fled the Kurdish-Turkish conflict in the 1990s, live in this refugee camp.

It has been subject to continuous drone strikes by the Turkish state.

References

Populated places in Nineveh Governorate
Kurdish settlements in Iraq